The Radcliffe Pitches are a premier treble-voiced a cappella singing ensemble at Harvard University, founded in 1975 at the Hasty Pudding Club. The group is made up of 12 to 14 Harvard undergraduates who perform at Harvard and internationally on the group's various tours. During their tours, the group has travelled within the U.S. and to international destinations including Bermuda, Spain, England, France, Germany, China and several other countries. The Pitches also perform regularly on the Harvard campus; they can be heard at large concerts in Sanders Theatre and smaller gigs including The Annual Breast Cancer Awareness Jam alongside other all-female ensembles in Cabot Café. Other notable performances include appearances at the 1993 inauguration celebrations for President William Clinton and the Hasty Pudding Man of the Year awards.

The Pitches' repertoire is based in jazz standards and inspired by artists such as Ella Fitzgerald and Frank Sinatra. Songs in their repertoire include: "Whatever Lola Wants", "It Don't Mean a Thing (If It Ain't Got That Swing)", and "My Funny Valentine". The Pitches also perform jazz twists to popular songs, for example; an arrangement of  American Boy by Estelle which they performed in Sanders Theatre Spring 2015 at their 40th Anniversary Jam. All of the Pitch arrangements are done specifically for the group by current and previous members of the group and friends of the group.

The group's founders were Radcliffe College undergraduates who wanted to sing in a close harmony setting. The original Pitches chose their group's name from a number of entries in a campus naming contest. In the words of co-founder Kathy Manning (Radcliffe College Class of 1978):

The Pitches choose new group members through an audition process, held in the fall and spring of each academic year and open to all Harvard undergraduates.

Selected Repertoire 

 A Nightingale Sang in Berkeley Square
 Anything Goes
 Baby, I Love You
 Bei Mir Bist Du Schön
 Big Girls Don't Cry
 Boogie Woogie Bugle Boy
 Don't Tell Mama
 Fire
 House of Blue Lights
 It Don't Mean a Thing (If It Ain't Got That Swing)
 It's My Party
 It's Raining Men
 I’ve Been Loving You
 Mack the Knife
 Makin’ Whoopee
 Mr. Sandman
 My Funny Valentine
 My Baby Just Cares for Me
 Never Will I Marry
 Oh! Darling
 Orange Colored Sky
 Our Love is Here to Stay
 Precious
 Roxanne
 Saving All My Love for You
 Say a Little Prayer
 That Old Feeling
 The Masquerade Is Over
 This Could Be the Start of Something Great
 Trashin’ the Camp
 Tuxedo Junction
 Whatever Lola Wants (Lola Gets)
 What a Wonderful World
 You'd Be Surprised
 You Don't Own Me

References

External links
The Radcliffe Pitches official website
Records, 1978-1996. Schlesinger Library, Radcliffe Institute, Harvard University.

Harvard University
Harvard University musical groups
Collegiate a cappella groups
Musical groups established in 1975
University choirs